Clyde W. Biggers (March 6, 1925 – December 23, 1976) was an American football coach and college athletics administrator. He served as the head football coach at Catawba College from 1953 to 1958 and at Eastern Illinois University from 1965 to 1971, compiling a career college football record of 45–70–6. Biggers was then the athletic director at University of Nebraska Omaha from 1971 to 1974 and at the University of Richmond from 1974 until his death in 1976.

Biggers played football and baseball at Catawba College, from which he graduated in 1948. He coached football at Fayetteville High School in Fayetteville, North Carolina before serving as the line coach for the football team at East Carolina College—now East Carolina University—in 1952. Between his tenures as head coach at Catawba and Eastern Illinois, Biggers was an assistant coach at the University of South Carolina. He died of a heart attack at his home in Richmond, Virginia on December 23, 1976.

Head coaching record

References

External links
 

1925 births
1976 deaths
Catawba Indians baseball players
Catawba Indians football coaches
Catawba Indians football players
East Carolina Pirates football coaches
Eastern Illinois Panthers football coaches
Omaha Mavericks athletic directors
Richmond Spiders athletic directors
South Carolina Gamecocks football coaches
High school football coaches in North Carolina
People from Concord, North Carolina
Coaches of American football from North Carolina
Players of American football from North Carolina
Baseball players from North Carolina